"Dirty Harry" is a song from British alternative rock virtual band Gorillaz' second studio album, Demon Days (2005).

Song history
"Dirty Harry" was first released as a promotional single on iTunes before being released as the third single from the album on 21 November 2005, peaking at number six in the United Kingdom. An early version entitled "I Need a Gun" was included on Damon Albarn's album Democrazy. On 8 December 2005, "Dirty Harry" was nominated for a Grammy under the category "Urban/Alternative Performance", but was beaten by Damian "Jr. Gong" Marley's "Welcome to Jamrock". It became Gorillaz' 3rd consecutive top 10 hit and last song to make it on the top 10 to this date.

Music video
The video was first released on 25 October 2005, sent to those on the e-mail list on Gorillaz' official website. A thematic follow-up to the band's "Clint Eastwood", it refers to the film of the same name, Clint Eastwood being the lead actor in the movie. "Dirty Harry" is the first Gorillaz music video to be shot on location; initially, the group intended to utilise a computer animated desert as background, but discovered that simply flying to a real desert was easier and cheaper.

The video was shot in the Swakopmund Desert in Namibia; it mainly features a shirtless 2-D and an animated version of the San Fernando Valley Youth Chorus stranded in the desert, following what appears to have been a helicopter crash. The survivors keep themselves entertained with the song while awaiting the arrival of rescuers, portrayed by Noodle and Murdoc crewing a Windhoeker Maschinenfabrik Wer’wolf MKII mine-proof vehicle driven by Russel.

Both song and video feature a guest appearance by Pharcyde rapper Bootie Brown, who leaps out of a sand dune in military fatigues to perform his verse of the song. The video concludes with Gorillaz, the children, and Bootie Brown departing the crash site in the Wer'wolf, which breaks down a short distance away.

Track listings

UK CD1 and digital download 1
 "Dirty Harry" – 3:52
 "All Alone" (live) – 3:39

UK CD2 and digital download 2
 "Dirty Harry" (single edit) – 3:51
 "Hongkongaton" – 3:33
 "Dirty Harry" (Chopper Remix) – 3:40

UK DVD single
 "Dirty Harry" (video) – 5:00
 "Murdoc Is God" – 2:26
 "Dirty Harry" (animatic with "Dirty Harry" instrumental) – 4:21

European and Australian CD single
 "Dirty Harry" – 3:50
 "Dirty Harry" (Chopper Remix) – 3:40
 "Hongkongaton" – 3:35
 "Dirty Harry" (music video) – 5:00
 "Dirty Harry" (animatic with "Dirty Harry" instrumental) – 4:21

Japanese CD single
 "Dirty Harry" – 3:50
 "All Alone" (live) – 3:40
 "Hongkongaton" – 3:35
 "Dirty Harry" (Chopper Remix) – 3:40
 "Dirty Harry" (video) – 5:00

Personnel

 Damon Albarn – vocals, synthesizers, guitars, string arrangements
 Bootie Brown – vocals
 Jason Cox – mixing, engineering
 James Dring – drum programming
 Al Mobbs – double bass
 Emma Smith – double bass
 Amanda Drummond – viola
 Stella Page – viola
 Prabjote Osahn – violin
 Sally Jackson – violin
 Isabelle Dunn – cello
 Danger Mouse – sampled loops, percussion, drum programming, mixing
 Howie Weinberg – mastering
 Steve Sedgwick – mixing assistance
 The San Fernandez Youth Chorus – additional vocals

Charts

Weekly charts

Year-end charts

Certifications

Release history

See also
 List of anti-war songs

References

External links
 Rolling Stone article
 MTV news article with confirmation

2005 singles
2005 songs
British funk songs
Gorillaz songs
Parlophone singles
Song recordings produced by Danger Mouse (musician)
Songs written by Damon Albarn